Jessica Lisa Camacho (born November 26, 1982) is an American actress. She is known for her recurring role as Gypsy in The CW superhero series The Flash. Camacho also starred on the second season of the NBC drama series Taken.

Early life
Born in Chicago, Camacho got her first taste of acting when she took an acting class at the suggestion of a friend. She instantly fell in love with the craft and moved to San Francisco, where she supported herself as a waitress while taking night classes at the renowned American Conservatory Theater. She went on to work in theatre and television in Chicago, where she was able to obtain her Screen Actors Guild membership card before settling full time in Los Angeles.

Filmography

Film

Television

References

External links
 
 

1982 births
21st-century American actresses
Hispanic and Latino American actresses
Living people